The 1986 NCAA Division I Cross Country Championships were the 48th annual NCAA Men's Division I Cross Country Championship and the 6th annual NCAA Women's Division I Cross Country Championship to determine the team and individual national champions of NCAA Division I men's and women's collegiate cross country running in the United States. In all, four different titles were contested: men's and women's individual and team championships.

Held on November 24, 1986, the combined meet was hosted by the University of Arizona at the Canada Hills County Club in Tucson, Arizona. The distance for the men's race was 10 kilometers (6.21 miles) while the distance for the women's race was 5 kilometers (3.11 miles).

The men's team national championship was won by Arkansas, their second national title. The individual championship was won by Aaron Ramirez, from Arizona, with a time of 30:27.53.

The women's team national championship was won by Texas, their first national title. The individual championship was won by Angela Chalmers, from Northern Arizona, with a time of 16:55.49.

Qualification
All Division I cross country teams were eligible to qualify for the meet through their placement at various regional qualifying meets. In total, 22 teams and 173 runners contested the men's championship while 15 teams and 129 runners contested the women's title.

Men's title
Distance: 10,000 meters (6.21 miles)

Men's Team Result (Top 10)

Men's Individual Result (Top 10)

Women's title
Distance: 5,000 meters (3.11 miles)

Women's Team Result (Top 10)

Women's Individual Result (Top 10)

See also
NCAA Men's Cross Country Championships (Division II, Division III)
NCAA Women's Cross Country Championships (Division II, Division III)

References
 

NCAA Cross Country Championships
NCAA Division I Cross Country Championships
NCAA Division I Cross Country Championships
NCAA Division I Cross Country Championships
Sports in Tucson, Arizona
Track and field in Arizona
University of Arizona
Events in Tucson, Arizona